Thomas Edison High School of Technology (often referred to as Thomas Edison or Edison) is a public vocational/technical high school located in Wheaton, an unincorporated section of Montgomery County, Maryland. It is located next to Wheaton High School.

Edison is a member of the Downcounty Consortium. All programs consist of an academic base, industry competency requirements, employability skill development and career/college planning components, as well as opportunities for leadership development. Thomas Edison registers all students who are enrolled in the career and technical student organization, SkillsUSA.

Typically, students spend half of their day at Thomas Edison, and the other half at their home school. Thomas Edison offers two sessions: the morning session from 8:05 AM to 10:35 AM, and the afternoon session from 11:20 AM to 1:50 PM.

Thomas Edison is also the headquarters for the Montgomery County Students Trades Foundations Office.

Programs
Thomas Edison offers nineteen programs for students to choose from. Courses take one, two or three years to complete, depending on the curriculum.

One year programs
 Academy of Hospitality and Tourism
 Foundations of Building and Construction
 Medical Careers
 Network Operations
 Cybersecurity

Two year programs
 Academy of Health Professions
 Automotive Body Repair Technology
 Automotive Technology
 Carpentry
 Construction Electricity
 Foundations of Automotive Technology
 Heating Ventilation and Air Conditioning
 Masonry
 Plumbing
 Principles of Architecture & CAD Technologies
 Print Technologies & Digital Graphics
 Restaurant Management

Three year programs
 Cosmetology

Wheaton-Edison Partnership Programs 
Students in Wheaton High School academy's can(if won the lottery) take courses at Edison that are similar to what they are learning in their academy's. 

 Construction Management & Architecture (Engineering Academy)
 Healthcare Professions (Bioscience Academy)
 Hospitality and Tourism Management (Global Studies Academy)
 Information Technology and Cybersecurity (Academy of Information Technology)

Student body
For the 2016-2017 school year, Thomas Edison has a total of 576 enrolled students, 70.3% male and 29.7% female. The student body is 62.0% Hispanic, 18.8% African American, 12.7% White, and 5.0% or less in each of the following: Asian; American Indian or Alaskan Native; Hawaiian or other Pacific Islander; and two or more (multiple) races.

External links

 Washington Post reports on the Thomas Edison High School home building program

References

Public high schools in Maryland
Public schools in Montgomery County, Maryland
Educational institutions established in 1954
1954 establishments in Maryland